German Australians are Australians with German ancestry. German Australians constitute one of the largest ancestry groups in Australia, and German is the fifth most identified European ancestry in Australia behind English, Irish, Scottish and Italian. German Australians are one of the largest groups within the global German diaspora. At the 2021 census, 1,026,138 respondents stated that they had German ancestry (whether alone or in combination with another ancestry), representing 4% of the total Australian population. At the 2021 census, there were 107,940 Australian residents who were born in Germany.

History 

Germans have been in Australia since the commencement of European settlement in 1788. At least seventy-three Germans arrived in Australia as convicts.

19th century

Germans formed the largest non-English-speaking group in Australia up to the 20th century.

Old Lutherans

Old Lutherans emigrated in response to the 1817 Prussian Union and organized churches both among themselves and with other German speakers, such as the Kavel-Fritzsche Synod.

Although a few individuals had emigrated earlier, the first large group of Germans arrived in South Australia 1838, not long after the British colonisation of South Australia. These "Old Lutherans" were from Province of Brandenburg (then a Prussian province), and were trying to preserve their traditional faith. They emigrated with the financial assistance of George Fife Angas and the Emigration Fund. Not all subsequent arrivals shared this religious motivation, but the Lutheran Church remained at the centre of the German settlers' lives right into the 20th century.

Forty-Eighters
Forty-Eighters is a term for those who participated in or supported the European Revolutions of 1848. Many emigrated as a result of those revolutions. In particular, following the ultimate failure of the "March Revolution" in Germany, a substantial number of Germans immigrated to Australia. See Forty-Eighters in Australia.

20th century
By 1900, Germans were the fourth-largest European ethnic group on the continent, behind the English, Irish and Scots. By 1914, the number of German-Australians (including the descendants of German-born migrants of the second and third generation who had become Australians by birth) was estimated at approximately 100,000.

Throughout both world wars Australians of German ancestry were considered an "enemy within" and a number were interned or deported – or both. The persecution of German Australians also included the closure of German schools, the banning of the German language in government schools, and the renaming of many German place names. To avoid persecution and/or to demonstrate that they commit themselves to their new home, many German Australians changed their names into Anglicised or Francophone variants. During WWII, Australia was also place of incarceration of 2,542 "enemy aliens" deported from Britain, composed of many of the Austrian and German nationals who were expelled in a blanket deportation, and numerous Italian citizens. Notorious for the inhumane treatment present during the voyage, the 2,053 anti-Nazis, 451 prisoners of war, and approximately 55 Nazi sympathisers and others departed from Liverpool via  shortly after the Fall of France in 1940.

After the Second World War, Australia received a large influx of ethnic German displaced persons who were a significant proportion of Australia's post war immigrants. A number of German scientists were recruited soon after the War through the ESTEA scheme some of them coming by migrant ships such as the Partizanka. In the 1950s and 1960s, German immigration continued under assisted migration programs promoted by the Australian Government. By July 2000, Germany was the fifth most common birthplace for settler arrivals in Australia after United Kingdom, Ireland, Italy and New Zealand. By 1991, there were 112,000 German-born persons in Australia.

World War I

The internment camps were maintained by the Australian Army during World War I. At the time, they were also described as concentration camps. Old prison buildings in Berrima and Trial Bay Gaol were initially used as locations for camps in New South Wales.

The largest internment camp in WWI was the Holsworthy Internment Camp, located west of Sydney. There were camps in Berrima; Bourke; Holsworthy and Trial Bay (all New South Wales); Enoggera, Queensland; Langwarrin, Victoria; the Molonglo camp at Fyshwick, Australian Capital Territory; Rottnest Island, Western Australia; and Torrens Island, South Australia. Smaller and temporary internment camps were also established on Bruny Island, Tasmania; Fort Largs, South Australia; and Garden Island, Western Australia. The camp on Rottnest Island, which operated from the end of 1914 until the end of 1915, housed 989 people in September 1915. Among this group were 841 Australian and Austrian internees, as well as 148 prisoners of war. According to a statement by the Australian War Memorial organisation, there were a total of 7,000 people interned over the course of World War I, including roughly 4,500 Germans and British people of German background who had already been living in Australia for a long time. This meant approximately 4.5% of the German-Australian population were held in internment camps.

One of the largest internment camps for imprisoned officers and soldiers of the Imperial German Navy from the warzones in the Pacific, in China and in Southeast Asia, was the Trial Bay Gaol. Among those interned were German and Austrian business people who had been captured on ships, as well as wealthy, high-standing Germans and Austrians living in Australia who were assumed to be sympathising with the enemy. The camp was opened in August 1915 and at its peak contained as many as 580 men. The internees were held in solitary cells within the prison, with the exception of those with a high social or military rank, who were kept in cabins on the bay. The prisoners were free to swim, fish, and sunbathe on the beach or play tennis in the prison yard on a court they had built themselves. In 1916 they held a theatre performance of the comedy Minna von Barnhelm by Gotthold Ephraim Lessing. They had their own orchestra and in 1917 created their own newspaper named Welt am Montag (World on Monday), which was published once a week. In memory of the four Germans who died in the camp, the internees built a monument on the hill at Trial Bay. The internees were transferred in 1918 due to fears that German warships would be able to land in the bay. They were moved to the Holsworthy internment camp near Sydney, now Holsworthy Barracks. After it became known that graves of the Allied forces in Germany had been vandalised, the internees' monument was destroyed. It was once again constructed in 1960 and now leads the way to the memorial site on the hill.

Some Australians believed that the prisoners were being treated too well. However, they were under constant surveillance, their post was censored and contact with the outside world (as well as contact with internees from other camps) was not allowed.

Many internees from Western Australia were transported to camps in New South Wales, including the 193 German marines from the SMS Emden which had been defeated by HMAS Sydney.

After the war ended, the camps were shut down and most of the occupants were deported, but German immigration was only made legal again in 1925. The German population increased slowly as a result and eventually came to a halt in 1933 with Adolf Hitler's rise to power.

World War II

In World War I, the majority of internees were of German heritage. However, in World War II, a large number of Italians and Japanese were also imprisoned. The internees, which included women and children, had come from more than 30 different countries, including Finland, Hungary, Portugal and also the Soviet Union. In addition to the Australian residents who were imprisoned, there were also people of German and Japanese descent who were captured overseas and brought to Australia. These people came from England, Palestine, Iran, present-day Singapore, Malaysia, Indonesia, New Zealand and New Caledonia. The first of these groups arrived on the HMT Dunera from England in 1940 and their destination was the Hay Internment Camp in New South Wales.

The internment camps in WWII were constructed for three reasons: residents could not be allowed to support Australia's enemies, the public needed to be placated, and those who had been captured overseas and transported to Australia had to be housed somewhere. All Japanese people were immediately imprisoned, but it was only after the war criminals of Nazi Germany and Fascist Italy were discovered that Germans and Italians were sent to the internment camps. This was especially true for those living in northern Australia, because that was where the enemy was expected to invade. More than 20 percent of Italians in Australia were held in internment camps as well as a total of 7,000 people with connections to the enemy, 1,500 of which who were British nationals. 8,000 people from overseas were detained in Australian camps and in 1942, the camps were at their largest, with a total of 12,000 internees in the country. In addition to British people of German origin, Australian fascists could not escape imprisonment: leading members of the Australia First Movement were interned, including Adela Pankhurst and P. R. Stephensen.

Demographics

German Australians constitute one of the largest ancestry groups in Australia, and German is the fifth most identified European ancestry in Australia behind English, Irish, Scottish and Italian. German Australians are one of the largest groups within the global German diaspora. At the 2021 census, 1,026,135 respondents stated that they had German ancestry (whether alone or in combination with another ancestry), representing 4% of the total Australian population. At the 2021 census, there were 101,255 Australian residents who were born in Germany.

At the 2021 census, states and territories with the largest numbers of residents nominating German ancestry were Queensland (309,723), New South Wales (242,546), Victoria (212,907), South Australia (135,225) and Western Australia (78,337). German Australians are therefore overrepresented on a per capita basis in Queensland and South Australia.

In December 2001, the Australian Department of Foreign Affairs estimated that there were 15,000 Australian citizens resident in Germany.

According to census data released by the Australian Bureau of Statistics in 2004, German Australians are, by religion, 21.7 per cent Catholic, 16.5 per cent Anglican, 32.8 per cent Other Christian, 4.2 Other Religions and 24.8 No Religion.

In 2001, the German language was spoken at home by 76,400 persons in Australia. German is the eighth most widely spoken language in the country after English, Chinese, Italian, Greek, Arabic, Vietnamese, Spanish, and Tagalog.

Culture
The Australian wine industry was the creation of German settlers in the nineteenth century.

The Goethe-Institut is active in Australia, there are branches in Melbourne and Sydney.

The South Australian German Association has held the annual traditional Adelaide Schützenfest in Brooklyn Park Australia

Education
There are the following German international schools in Australia:
 German International School Sydney
 Deutsche Schule Melbourne

Media
Historically, German newspapers were set up by early settlers, with many being forced to close or merge due to labour shortages caused by the Victorian gold rush of the 1850s-1860s. A number of the earliest South Australian newspapers were printed primarily in German, and these included:

Die Deutsche Post für die Australischen Colonien (1848–1850) – Adelaide: Australia's first non-English newspaper
Suedaustralische Zeitung (1850–1851) – Adelaide
Deutsche Zeitung für Süd-Australien (1851) – Tanunda
Adelaider Deutsche Zeitung (1851–1862) – Adelaide: this was also the first German language newspaper to publish an entertainment supplement, Blätter für Ernst und Scherz.
Süd Australische Zeitung (1860–1874) – Tanunda/Adelaide
Australisches Unterhaltungsblatt (1862–1916) – Tanunda: a supplement to the Süd Australische Zeitung and Australische Zeitung
Tanunda Deutsche Zeitung (1863–1869) – Tanunda; later renamed Australische Deutsche Zeitung
Australische Deutsche Zeitung (1870–1874) – Tanunda/Adelaide: a Melbourne edition of the newspaper was also printed 1870–1872.
Neue Deutsche Zeitung (1875–1876) – Adelaide: opposition newspaper to Australische Zeitung
Australische Zeitung (1875–1916) – Tanunda/Adelaide: formed by the merger of Süd Australische Zeitung, and Australische Deutsche Zeitung; closed due to WWI
Australische Zeitung (1927–1929) – Tanunda: attempted revival
Adelaider Post (1960–1962) – Adelaide: South Australian edition of the Sydney-based .
Neue Australische Post (1984–1993), Salisbury

The Special Broadcasting Service airs a German-language radio program on SBS Radio 2 every weekday from 7 PM to 8 PM. They also air German broadcaster Deustche-Welle's Der Tag news program every morning as part of its WorldWatch programming block.

Missions founded by Germans

Killalpaninna Mission (1866 – 1915): Founded by Johann Friedrich Gößling and Ernst Homann, and two lay brethren, Hermann Vogelsang and Ernst Jakob; later joined by Strehlow.
Hermannsburg, Northern Territory (1877 – 1982?): Founded by A. Hermann Kemp (sometimes spelt Kempe) and Wilhelm F. Schwarz of the Hermannsburg Mission in Germany.
Aurukun Mission (1904 – 1913), originally Archer River Mission Station, Queensland: Founded by Moravians Rev. Arthur Richter and his wife Elisabeth
Bathurst Island Mission (1911 – 1978), founded by Francis Xavier Gsell
La Grange Mission at Bidyadanga (1955/6–1985)

Notable Australians of German ancestry

German missionaries
There were many German missionaries who emigrated to Australia, established mission stations and worked with Aboriginal Australians, in some cases helping to preserve their languages and culture.

1838: Rev. Clamor Wilhelm Schürmann (1815–1893) and Christian Gottlob Teichelmann (1807–1893) established and ran the Pirltawardli (or Piltawodli) Native Location in Adelaide from 1838 to 1845, learning the local Kaurna language, teaching the Kaurna in their own language and translating texts. Later Samuel Klose joined them. Their work provided the basis for a language revival in the 21st century, after the language was all but extinct.
1892: Carl Strehlow was an anthropologist, linguist and genealogist who served on two Lutheran missions, Killalpaninna Mission (also known as Bethesda) in northern South Australia from 1892, and then, from October 1894, Hermannsburg, Northern Territory (also known as Finke River), renowned for its artists, with his wife Frieda Strehlow. They were the parents of noted anthropologist Ted Strehlow.
1901: German Pallotine missionaries took over the running of the mission station at Beagle Bay Mission in Western Australia.
La Grange Mission at Bidyadanga (1955/6–1985), was run by Thomas Bachmair (1872–1918). Considered an "enlightened" mission, there was a strong emphasis on enculturation and respect for traditional customs and obligations.

See also
 Barossa German
 European Australians
 Forty-Eighters
 German New Zealanders
 German settlement in Australia
 Goethe-Institut
 History of the Lutheran Church of Australia
 Immigration to Australia
 List of Australian place names changed from German names
 Lutheran Church of Australia
 Temple Society Australia
 German diaspora

Notes

References

Further reading
 Lehmann, Hartmut. "South Australian German Lutherans in the second half of the nineteenth century: A case of rejected assimilation?" Journal of Intercultural Studies 2.2 (1981): 24–42. online
 
 Petersson, Irmtraud. German Images in Australian Literature from the 1940s to the 1980s (P. Lang, 1990)
 Seitz, Anne, and Lois Foster. "Dilemmas of immigration—Australian expectations, migrant responses: Germans in Melbourne." Journal of Sociology 21.3 (1985): 414–430. online
  (Germans in Sydney)
 Tolley, Julie Holbrook. "A social and cultural investigation of women in the wine industry of South Australia" (thesis, 2004) online

External links
 Zivil Lager (Internment Camp): World War One Prisoners Of War At Trial Bay (online exhibition)
 The Enemy At Home: German Internees in World War One Australia (online exhibition)
 Interview with Sophie Schütt about South Australian Documentary (in German)
 South Australia on German TV – article about Sophie Schütt travel documentary
 German Australian Aliens of Militarism
 German missionaries in Australia

Immigration to Australia
European Australian
 
Australia